The Velyka Vys is a river in Ukraine, a left tributary of the Synyukha, in the basin of the Southern Bug. The Velyka Vys river finds its source near the village of Onykiyeve in Novoukrainka Raion, Kirovohrad Oblast. It flows through Novomyrhorod.

References

 Географічна енциклопедія України: в 3-х томах / Редколегія: О. М. Маринич (відпов. ред.) та ін. — К.: «Українська радянська енциклопедія» імені М. П. Бажана, 1989.

Rivers of Cherkasy Oblast
Rivers of Kirovohrad Oblast